The  is a national expressway in Chiba Prefecture, Japan.  It is owned and operated by East Nippon Expressway Company.

Naming

Tateyama refers to the city of the same name on the Bōsō Peninsula, a major city in the region. Though the Tateyama Expressway does not actually reach the city proper, its extension the Futtsu Tateyama Road terminates at a point just beyond the city boundary in Minamibōsō City.

Officially the expressway is referred to as the Higashi-Kantō Expressway Tateyama Route and the Higashi-Kantō Expressway Chiba Futtsu Route.

Overview

Together with the Keiyō Road and Futtsu Tateyama Road, the expressway forms a link connecting the greater Tokyo area with southern Chiba Prefecture. The expressway has a junction with the Tokyo Bay Aqua-Line, creating the only direct road link connecting Chiba and Kanagawa Prefectures.

The first section of the expressway was opened to traffic in 1995 and the entire route was completed in 2007. The section from Kimitsu Interchange to Futtsu-Takeoka Interchange is 2 lanes, while the remainder is 4 lanes.

List of interchanges and features

 IC - interchange, JCT - junction, SA - service area, PA - parking area, BS - bus stop, TN - tunnel, BR - bridge, TB - toll gate

Main Route

Kisarazu-minami Branch Route

References

External links

 East Nippon Expressway Company

Expressways in Japan
Roads in Chiba Prefecture